Epidermal growth factor receptor substrate 15-like 1 is a protein that in humans is encoded by the EPS15L1 gene.

Interactions 

EPS15L1 has been shown to interact with HRB.

References

Further reading 

 
 
 
 
 
 
 
 
 
 
 
 
 
 

EF-hand-containing proteins